Find a Light is the sixth studio album by American rock band Blackberry Smoke. The album was self-produced by the band and it was released on April 6, 2018.

Critical reception

Find a Light has received largely positive reviews from professional music critics, and has an overall Metacritic rating of 72 based on 4 critics, indicating "generally favorable reviews".

Commercial performance
The album debuted at No. 3 on the Top Country Albums chart,  N. 2 on Americana/Folk Albums, and No. 31 on the Billboard 200, selling 9,000 copies (16,000 equivalent album units) in the first week. It has sold 31,300 copies in the United States as of November 2018.

Track listing

Personnel

Musicians 
Charlie Starr - lead vocals, guitar, pedal steel, banjo. 
Richard Turner - bass guitar, vocals.
Paul Jackson - guitar, vocals. 
Brandon Still - piano, organ.
Brit Turner - drums, percussion.

Charts

References

2018 albums
Blackberry Smoke albums